Rice (Rees, Rhys) Morgan (died 1577), of Nevern, Pembrokeshire, was a Welsh politician.

He was a Member (MP) of the Parliament of England for Haverfordwest in 1563.

References

Year of birth missing
1577 deaths
16th-century Welsh politicians
Members of the Parliament of England (pre-1707) for constituencies in Wales
English MPs 1563–1567